In statistics, the Khmaladze transformation is a mathematical tool used in constructing convenient goodness of fit tests for hypothetical distribution functions. More precisely, suppose  are i.i.d., possibly multi-dimensional, random observations generated from an unknown probability distribution. A classical problem in statistics is to decide how well a given hypothetical distribution function , or a given hypothetical parametric family of distribution functions , fits the set of observations. The Khmaladze transformation allows us to construct goodness of fit tests with desirable properties. It is named after Estate V. Khmaladze.

Consider the sequence of empirical distribution functions  based on a sequence of i.i.d random variables, as n increases. Suppose  is the hypothetical distribution function of each .

 

The change of the variable ,  transforms to the so-called uniform empirical process . The latter is an empirical processes based on independent random variables , which are uniformly distributed on  if the s do indeed have distribution function .

That is, test statistics  are defined (which possibly depend on the  being tested) in such a way that there exists another statistic  derived from the uniform empirical process, such that . Examples are

 

and

 

However, it is only rarely that one needs to test a simple hypothesis, when a fixed  as a hypothesis is given. Much more often, one needs to verify parametric hypotheses where the  hypothetical , depends on some parameters , which the hypothesis does not specify and which have to be estimated from the sample  itself.

 

From mid-1950s to the late-1980s, much work was done to clarify the situation and understand the nature of the process .

In 1981, and then 1987 and 1993, Khmaladze suggested to replace the parametric empirical process  by its martingale part  only.

 

 

For a long time the transformation was, although known, still not used. Later, the work of researchers like Koenker, Stute, Bai, Koul, Koening, and others made it popular in econometrics and other fields of statistics.

See also
Empirical process

References

Further reading

Theory of probability distributions
Empirical process
Transforms